Mohammadabad (also Romanized as Moḩammadābād) is a village in Nashtifan Rural District, in the Central District of Khaf County, Razavi Khorasan Province, Iran. At the 2006 census, its population was 345, in 84 families.

References 

Populated places in Khaf County